Tales From Serpentia is the fourth album from the German progressive metal band Tomorrow's Eve. It is the band's third release for the Lion Music label. The album features a number of creative aspects not yet attempted by the band. Tales From Serpentia is also the second full-length album to feature newly appointed Mekong Delta singer Martin LeMar.

Track listing
 "Nightfall" - 0:48        
 "The Years Ahead" - 5:33
 "Dream Diary" - 4:41
 "No Harm" - 6:12
 "Remember" - 5:50
 "Succubus" - 5:48
 "Warning" - 2:27
 "The Curse" - 5:47
 "The Tower" - 6:55
 "Faces" - 5:07
 "Muse" - 19:20

References

External links 
Tales From Serpentia at MySpace
Tales From Serpentia at CDBaby.com

Tomorrow's Eve (band) albums
2008 albums